The Curtiss Robin, introduced in 1928, was a high-wing monoplane built by the Curtiss-Robertson Airplane Manufacturing Company.
The J-1 version was flown by Wrongway Corrigan who crossed the Atlantic after being refused permission.

Design
The Robin, a workmanlike cabin monoplane, had a wooden wing and steel tubing fuselage. The cabin accommodated three persons; two passengers were seated side-by-side behind the pilot. Early Robins were distinguished by large flat fairings over the parallel diagonal wing bracing struts; the fairings were abandoned on later versions, having been found to be ineffective in creating lift. The original landing gear had bungee rubber cord shock absorbers, later replaced by an oleo-pneumatic system; a number of Robins had twin floats added. Variants of the Robin were fitted with engines which developed .

Operational history

A single modified Robin (with a  Warner R-420-1) was used by the United States Army Air Corps, and designated the XC-10. This aircraft was used in a test program for radio-controlled (and unmanned) flight.

Cuba's national airline, Compañía Nacional Cubana de Aviación Curtiss, was founded in 1929 with the Curtiss-Wright company serving as its co-founder and major investor. The airline's first aircraft was a Curtiss Robin and it was flown on domestic routes as a mail and passenger transport.

From September 1929 to May 1930 a Robin C-1 was used to deliver the McCook, Nebraska Daily Gazette to communities in rural Nebraska and Kansas.

A Curtiss Robin C was purchased by the Paraguayan government in 1932 for the transport squadron of its air arm. It was intensively used as a VIP transport plane and air ambulance during the Chaco War (1923–1935).

Variants (Model 50)
Data from:Curtiss aircraft : 1907-1947
Challenger Robin (Model 50A) An early version of the Robin, powered by a  Curtiss Challenger radial piston engine.
Comet Robin One Robin was converted by its owner in 1937, fitted with a  Comet 7-D radial piston engine.
Robin (Model 50A) Prototypes and initial production aircraft powered by  Curtiss OX-5 engines.
Robin B A three-seat cabin monoplane, fitted with wheel brakes and a steerable tailwheel, powered by a  Curtiss OX-5 V-8 engine; about 325 were built.
Robin B-2 A three-seat cabin monoplane, powered by a  Wright-Hisso "A","E" and "I" V-8 water-cooled piston engine.

Robin C-1 (Model 50C) An improved version of the Robin C, powered by a  Curtiss Challenger radial piston engine; over 200  built.
Robin C-2 (Model 50D) A long-range version fitted with an extra fuel tank, powered by a  Curtiss Challenger radial piston engine; six built.
Robin 4C  (Model 50E) A four-seat version, powered by a Curtiss Challenger radial piston engine; one built.
Robin 4C-1 A three-seat version with an enlarged forward fuselage section; three built.
Robin 4C-1A (Model 50G) Another four-seat version with an enlarged forward fuselage section; 11 built.
Robin 4C-2 A single un-certified version powered by a  Wright J-6-7 Whirlwind engine.
Robin CR A one-off experimental version, fitted with a  Curtiss Crusader engine.
Robin J-1 (Model 50H) Powered by a  Wright J-6-5 Whirlwind radial piston engine; about 40 built.
Robin J-2 (Model 50I) A long-range version, with  fuel. Two were built
Robin J-3 A J-1 temporarily designated J-3, which reverted to the J-1 designation after being de-modified.
Robin M A Robin B aircraft, fitted with the  Milwaukee Tank V-502 V-8 engine (air-cooled OX-5 conversions).
Robin W (Model 50J) Powered by a  Warner Scarab radial piston engine. Only a small number were built in 1930.

XC-10 One Robin W was sold to the United States Army Air Corps (USAAC) and converted into an unmanned pilot-less radio-controlled test aircraft, powered by a  Warner R-420-1.

Operators

Military operators

Paraguayan Air Force

United States Army Air Corps

Surviving aircraft

Australia
 477 – J-1 airworthy with John Graeme Vevers of Patterson Lakes, Victoria.

Brazil
 248 – C-2 in storage at the TAM Museum in São Carlos, São Paulo.

Canada
 405 – C-1 on display at the Reynolds-Alberta Museum in Wetaskiwin, Alberta.

Costa Rica
 C-1 on display at the Juan Santamaría International Airport domestic terminal in Alajuela, Costa Rica.

Germany
 130 – J-1 airworthy with Antique Aeroflyers in Mengen, Baden-Württemberg.

United States

 193 – B airworthy at the Fantasy of Flight in Polk City, Florida.
 213 – B airworthy at the Western Antique Aeroplane & Automobile Museum in Hood River, Oregon.
 329 – B-1 on static display at the San Diego Air & Space Museum in San Diego, California.
 337 – C-1 on static display at the Evergreen Aviation & Space Museum in McMinnville, Oregon.
 403 – B-2 on display at the EAA Aviation Museum in Oshkosh, Wisconsin.
 469 – C-1 on display at the Yanks Air Museum in Chino, California.
 628 – C-1 on static display at the Museum of Flight in Seattle, Washington.
 712 – 4C-1A on display at the Western North Carolina Air Museum in Hendersonville, North Carolina.
 733 – J-1D on display at the Shannon Air Museum in Fredericksburg, Virginia. It was previously on display at the Virginia Aviation Museum.
 737 – J-1 airworthy with Brian T. Coughlin of Cazenovia, New York. It is based at Old Rhinebeck Aerodrome.
 J-1 Ole Miss (US registration NR526N) on static display at the National Air and Space Museum in Washington, D.C. that set the aviation endurance record in 1935 (continuously airborne June 4-July 1), which it held for 4 years.
 On static display at the Cradle of Aviation Museum in Garden City, New York. It has floats in place of wheeled landing gear.
 On display at the Air Zoo in Portage, Michigan.
 On display at the Eagles Mere Air Museum in Eagles Mere, Pennsylvania.
 On static display at the Glenn H. Curtiss Museum in Hammondsport, New York.
 On display at the Historic Aircraft Restoration Museum in Maryland Heights, Missouri.
 Under restoration at the Candler Field Museum in Williamson, Georgia. Now owned and operated by Capt. Buerk’s Living History Museum in New Hampshire. 
 Under restoration at the Port Townsend Aero Museum in Port Townsend, Washington.

Specifications (Robin OX-5)

See also

References

Bibliography

External links

 Virginia Aircraft Museum
 Airminded.net
Curtiss Robin J-1 Deluxe "Ole Miss" 
 
A Curtiss Robin is rebuilt from an empty frame
A brief story of "Wrongway" Corrigan's adventure

Robin
1920s United States civil utility aircraft
Single-engined tractor aircraft
High-wing aircraft
Aircraft first flown in 1928